San Salvador de Nogal de las Huertas is a Cluniac monastery in Nogal de las Huertas, Spain.

It was founded in 1063 by the Countess Elvira Sánchez, and originally constructed with a central nave and a square apse. In the mid-twelfth century, Rodrigo, youngest son of Count Pedro González de Lara and his wife Eva, became its prior, an unprecedented move for a male member of an aristocratic family in Castile. In the thirteenth century two lateral naves (aisles) with the pointed arches typical of the Gothic style were added.

The monastery passed into private hands in the 19th century. In June 1931 its ruins were declared a monumento histórico–artístico, nowadays called a conjunto histórico.

Notes

Bibliography
Herrero Marcos, Jesús. Arquitectura y simbolismo del románico palentino. Ediciones Ars Magna, 1999.

External links

Photographs at Flickr
 Digitalized 3D elements of the monastery of  San Salvador de Nogal de las Huertas

Monasteries in Castile and León
Christian monasteries established in the 11th century
Cluniac monasteries in Spain
1063 establishments in Europe
1063 in Europe
11th-century establishments in the Kingdom of León
Bien de Interés Cultural landmarks in the Province of Palencia